Tshiabola Mapanya (born June 7, 1983) is a retired Congolese football defender.

Career 
Mapanya played for SC Cilu, before signed for FK Jablonec in July 2008. After only four months he left FK Baumit Jablonec and signed with League rival 1. FK Příbram.

He played in the 2008/2009 season six games played for 1. FK Příbram in the Czech League. He left in May 2010 the Czech Republic and signed with French Championnat de France amateur 2 club St Marcel Foot.

Notes

1983 births
Living people
Democratic Republic of the Congo footballers
Democratic Republic of the Congo international footballers
SC Cilu players
FK Jablonec players
1. FK Příbram players
Democratic Republic of the Congo expatriate footballers
Expatriate footballers in the Czech Republic
Democratic Republic of the Congo expatriate sportspeople in the Czech Republic
Association football defenders